Toh, TOH, or ToH may refer to:

 Tarso Toh, a volcano field in Chad
 This Old House, an American home improvement magazine and television series
 Tonga language (Mozambique) (ISO-639: toh)
 Top-of-hour (TOH) station identification, a legal requirement for radio stations
 Tower of Hanoi, a mathematical game or puzzle
 Treehouse of Horror (series), The Simpsons Halloween specials
 "Treehouse of Horror", the third episode in The Simpsons second season
 Trondheim Business School
 The Owl House, an American animated television series

People
 Toh (surname), a surname in Chinese, Korean, and other cultures
 Toh EnJoe (born 1972), Japanese author
 Toh Yah (1917–1952), Navajo painter